The British Academy Television Craft Awards of 2012 are presented by the British Academy of Film and Television Arts (BAFTA) and were held on 13 May 2012 at The Brewery, London, the ceremony was hosted by Alan Davies.

Winners and nominees
Winners will be listed first and highlighted in boldface.

Special awards
 Aidan Farrell

See also
 2012 British Academy Television Awards

References

External links
British Academy Craft Awards official website

2012 television awards
2012 in British television
2012 in London
May 2012 events in the United Kingdom
2012